Division No. 3 is one of eighteen census divisions in the province of Saskatchewan, Canada, as defined by Statistics Canada. It is located in the south-southwestern part of the province, adjacent to the border with Montana, United States. The most populous community in this division is Assiniboia.

Demographics 

Census subdivisions 
The following census subdivisions (municipalities or municipal equivalents) are located within Saskatchewan's Division No. 3.

Towns
Assiniboia
Coronach
Gravelbourg
Mossbank
Ponteix
Rockglen
Willow Bunch

Villages
Hazenmore
Kincaid
Limerick
Mankota
Neville
Vanguard
Wood Mountain

Rural municipalities

 RM No. 11 Hart Butte
 RM No. 12 Poplar Valley
 RM No. 42 Willow Bunch
 RM No. 43 Old Post
 RM No. 44 Waverley
 RM No. 45 Mankota
 RM No. 46 Glen McPherson
 RM No. 71 Excel
 RM No. 72 Lake of the Rivers
 RM No. 73 Stonehenge
 RM No. 74 Wood River
 RM No. 75 Pinto Creek
 RM No. 76 Auvergne
 RM No. 101 Terrell
 RM No. 102 Lake Johnston
 RM No. 103 Sutton
 RM No. 104 Gravelbourg
 RM No. 105 Glen Bain
 RM No. 106 Whiska Creek

Indian reserves
 Cowessess First Nation
 Cowessess 73
 Sturgeon Lake First Nation
 Sturgeon Lake 101C
 Wood Mountain Lakota First Nation
 Wood Mountain 160

Other communities

Aneroid
Bateman
Congress
Crane Valley
Ferland
Fife Lake
Flintoft
Glentworth
Killdeer
Lafleche
Mazenod
Mccord
Melaval
Meyronne
Ormiston
Pambrun
Scout Lake
Spring Valley
St. Victor
Verwood
Viceroy
Woodrow

See also 
List of census divisions of Saskatchewan
List of communities in Saskatchewan

References

Division No. 3, Saskatchewan Statistics Canada

 
03